Maiestas clavata is a species of bug from the Cicadellidae family that can be found in Liberia and Congo. It was originally placed in Recilia, but was moved to Maiestas in a 2009 revision.

References

Insects of Africa
Maiestas